Miloslava Tumová Záhorská is a former figure skater who competed in ladies' singles for Czechoslovakia. She appeared at six European Championships, achieving her best result, 8th, in 1954.

References 

Date of birth unknown
Czechoslovak female single skaters
Living people
Year of birth missing (living people)